School of the Performing Arts in the Richmond Community (SPARC) is a school of performing arts established in Richmond, Virginia, United States in 1981.  SPARC teaches children ages 3–18 in performing arts, such as singing, acting, and dancing.

Notable alumni
 Jason Mraz
 Corey Bradley, Mamma Mia! National Tour
 Zak Resnick, Broadway actor
 Jason Marks, Broadway actor
 Emily Skinner, Broadway actor
 Mary Page Nance, Broadway actor

References

External links

 

Educational institutions established in 1981
Schools in Richmond, Virginia
Schools of the performing arts in the United States
1981 establishments in Virginia